Naughty Boys (released in the Philippines as Supercop Protectors) is a 1986 Hong Kong martial arts crime comedy film directed by Wellson Chin, produced by Jackie Chan, and starring Kara Hui, Carina Lau, and Mars. The film was released in Hong Kong on 25 July 1986.

Plot
Four convicts plan to retrieve the diamond cache they hid before their imprisonment. One of them, Sheng, is released from prison early, and discovers that someone replaced the diamonds with rocks. The three other convicts mistakenly think he is keeping the diamonds for himself, and a chase for Sheng ensues all throughout Hong Kong.

Cast
Kara Hui as Chuan
Carina Lau as Bonnie, an investigator
Mars as Sheng, Chuan's brother
Clarence Ford as Liang, a travel agent
Billy Lau as Kuang Fu
Paul Chang
Phillip Ko as Ma Hui
Lo Mang as Huo Chiang
Tai Po as Piao
Chu Tit-wo

Jackie Chan has a cameo appearance in the film as a prisoner.

Release
Naughty Boys was released in Hong Kong on 25 July 1986. In the Philippines, the film was released by Pioneer Releasing as Supercop Protectors on 23 August 1988; posters miscredit Jackie Chan as its writer and director.

Home media
Naughty Boys was released on VHS in Japan on 21 October 1990.

The film was first released on DVD by Deltamac in Hong Kong on 31 December 2002; it has since gone out of print. The film was given by Joy Sales a VCD release on 23 July 2007, and another DVD release on 4 March 2010.

References

External links

1986 films
1980s action comedy films
1980s crime comedy films
1986 comedy films
1986 martial arts films
1980s Cantonese-language films
Golden Harvest films
Hong Kong action comedy films
Hong Kong crime films
Hong Kong martial arts comedy films
1980s Hong Kong films